Umaro Embaló (born 6 May 2001) is a professional footballer who plays for Fortuna Sittard as a forward. Born in Guinea-Bissau, he is a youth international for Portugal.

He scored on his basisdebut a beautifull goal against FC Volendam in a 2-0 win at home.

Honours
Benfica
Campeonato Nacional de Juniores: 2017–18
 UEFA Youth League runner-up: 2019–20

References

External links
 
 

2001 births
Living people
Sportspeople from Bissau
Portuguese footballers
Portugal youth international footballers
Bissau-Guinean footballers
Bissau-Guinean emigrants to Portugal
Association football forwards
Liga Portugal 2 players
S.L. Benfica B players